Abd Rahman bin Yusof (24 August 1957 – 7 June 2021) was a Malaysian politician who served as a  Member of Dewan Rakyat for Kemaman from 1999 to 2004. He was also a member of the People's Justice Party (PKR).

Yusof died on 07 Jun 2021.

Election results

References 

1957 births
2021 deaths
People from Terengganu
 People's Justice Party (Malaysia) politicians
Malaysian people of Malay descent
Members of the Dewan Rakyat